Paul Wittek (11 January 1894, Baden bei Wien — 13 June 1978, Eastcote, Middlesex) was an Austrian Orientalist and historian. His 1938 thesis on the rise of the Ottoman Empire, known as the ghazi thesis, argues that the driving force behind Ottoman state-building was the expansion of Islam. Until the 1980s, his theory was the most influential and dominant explanation of the formation of the Ottoman Empire.

Biography 
Wittek was conscripted at the outbreak of World War I as a reserve officer to an Austro-Hungarian artillery regiment. In October 1914, he suffered a head wound in Galicia and was taken to Vienna to recover. Subsequently, he served first on the Isonzo Front and in 1917 was drafted as a military adviser to the Ottoman Empire, where he was stationed in Istanbul and Syria until the war ended. Once the war ended, Wittek returned to Vienna and resumed his studies in ancient history, which he had already begun before the war. In 1920 he obtained his doctorate with a thesis on early Roman social and constitutional history, after which he dedicated himself to the study of Ottoman history.

Wittek was in Vienna during the emergence of the fledgling discipline of Ottoman studies. He was co-editor (with his mentor Kraelitz) and contributor to the first scholarly journal in this field, called Mitteilungen zur osmanischen Geschichte (Notes on Ottoman History), of which two volumes appeared between 1921 and 1926. For his livelihood Wittek worked as a journalist for the conservative literary and political fortnightly Österreichische Rundschau. After it ceased publication 1924, he moved back to Istanbul and wrote for the German-language Türkische Post, but soon became involved in the creation of the German Archaeological Institute in Istanbul, where he received an appointment by 1928. Wittek's activities included study tours to collect material on early Ottoman epigraphy. In Istanbul, he met and befriended the Russian Orientalist Vasilij Bartolʹd. He claimed a part in the collective effort of Turkish historians to put a halt to the sale of Ottoman treasury archives to Bulgaria as scrap paper by İsmet İnönü's government in 1931.

After the rise of Nazism Wittek moved with his family to Belgium in 1934, where he worked at the Institute for Byzantine Studies in Brussels with Henri Grégoire. After the German attack on Belgium Wittek fled in a small boat to England, where he was interned as an enemy alien. Thanks to the support of British Orientalists, in particular Hamilton Gibb, he was finally released and found a job at the University of London. After the war he returned to his family, who had remained in Belgium. In 1948 he came to London and took up the newly created Chair of Turkish at the School of Oriental and African Studies (SOAS), which he held until his retirement in 1961.

Wittek, who was close to the George Circle, published relatively little and mostly in short form, but became very influential within his discipline. His only books, on the principality of Menteşe and on the rise of the Ottoman Empire, appeared in the 1930s. In the latter Wittek formulated his ghazi thesis, according to which the ideology of sectarian struggle was the major cohesive factor in the formative phase of the Ottoman Empire. The ghazi thesis was, until Rudi Paul Lindner's nomad thesis in the 1980s, the prevailing view of the emergence of the Ottoman Empire.

Books
 Das Fürstentum Mentesche. Studie zur Geschichte Westkleinasiens im 13.–15. Jh., Istanbul 1934
 Das islamische Milet (with Karl Wulzinger and Friedrich Sarre), Berlin 1935 (Milet III.4)
 The Rise of the Ottoman Empire, London 1938
 Turkish (Lund Humphries Modern Language Readers), London 1945; revised 2nd edition, 1956
 La formation de l'Empire ottoman (Variorum Collected Studies, 153), ed. V.L. Ménage, London 1982

Notes

References

External links 
 Bibliography of Paul Wittek's publications until 1966: 
 

1894 births
1978 deaths
20th-century Austrian historians
Austrian people of Slavic descent
People from Baden bei Wien
Corresponding Fellows of the British Academy
Travelers in Asia Minor